Phenylalanine/tyrosine ammonia-lyase (EC 4.3.1.25, PTAL, bifunctional PAL) is an enzyme with systematic name L-phenylalanine(or L-tyrosine):trans-cinnamate(or trans-p-hydroxycinnamate) ammonia-lyase. This enzyme catalyses the following chemical reaction

 (1) L-phenylalanine  trans-cinnamate + NH3
 (2) L- tyrosine  trans-p-hydroxycinnamate + NH3

This enzyme is a member of the aromatic amino acid lyase family.

References

External links 
 

EC 4.3.1